Graphiadactyllis is an extinct genus of ostracod (seed shrimp) belonging to the family Quasillitidae and order Podocopida. Specimens have been found in Mississippian to Permian beds in North America,  Europe, and Australia.

Species 
G. arkansana Girty 1910
G. australae Crespin 1945
G. deminuera Gründel 1975
G. jonesi Ferdinando 2001

References 

Ostracods
Permian crustaceans
Carboniferous crustaceans
Carboniferous animals of Australia
Permian animals of Australia
Carboniferous arthropods of Europe
Permian arthropods of Europe
Carboniferous arthropods of North America
Permian arthropods of North America